José Velásquez may refer to:
José Velásquez (cyclist) (born 1970), Colombian cyclist
José Velásquez (explorer) (1717–1785), Spanish explorer
José Velásquez (footballer, born 1952), Peruvian footballer
José Velásquez (footballer, born 1998), Peruvian footballer
José Antonio Velásquez (1906–1983), Honduran painter
José David Velásquez (born 1989), Honduran footballer
José Manuel Velázquez (born 1990), Venezuelan footballer
José Miguel Velásquez (born 1967), Venezuelan-born composer, music producer and vocal coach